Social Dynamics: A Journal of African Studies is a triannual peer-reviewed academic journal published by Routledge in association with the Centre for African Studies (University of Cape Town). It was established in 1975 and covers African studies. The editors-in-chief are Christopher Ouma (University of Cape Town), Bernard Dubbeld (Stellenbosch University), and Lauren Paremoer (University of Cape Town).

Abstracting and indexing
The journal is abstracted and indexed in:
Current Contents/Social and Behavioral Sciences
EBSCO databases
Index Islamicus
Modern Language Association Database
ProQuest databases
Scopus
Social Sciences Citation Index
CSA databases
According to the Journal Citation Reports, the journal has a 2021 impact factor of 0.483.

References

External links

English-language journals
Publications established in 1975
Triannual journals
University of Cape Town
Routledge academic journals